David Schomer is a co-founder of Espresso Vivace. The Seattle Times said "Schomer is as influential in the gourmet coffee world as Starbucks CEO Howard Schultz is in the mainstream coffee industry."

Early life and education
Schomer joined the United States Air Force   in 1974.
Schomer received a BFA in classical flute performance from Cornish College of the Arts in Seattle.

Career
Schomer became known within the coffee industry for his innovations, such as how he customizes his grinders and espresso machines with PID controllers to achieve a more constant water temperature.  His methods have influenced latte making at Portland's Stumptown Coffee Roasters, New York's Ninth Street Espresso, and Chicago's Intelligentsia Coffee & Tea. Ninth Street's Kenneth Nye said Schomer's work developing his techniques, "was light-years ahead of the conversation at the time". Schomer thought that when he opened Vivace in 1988, he had "missed the peak" of the espresso explosion, when in fact his scientific exploration of extraction methods was not happening elsewhere.

Besides training hundreds of baristas who went on to influence coffee shops across the country, Schomer self published a book on espresso techniques in 1994, while also writing columns for Café Ole magazine in the 1990s. Mark Pendergrast said that Schomer inherited the title of "world's most passionate espresso engineer" upon the death of Italian food chemist Ernesto Illy in 2008. Schomer's 1996 Espresso Coffee: Professional Techniques has been described as "the industry bible".

Schomer credits Espresso Vivace's survival in a competitive market to his own "absolute fidelity" to the goal of "making a better cup", together with the sound fiscal and operations management of his business partner and former spouse, Geneva Sullivan. Espresso Vivaces's first incarnation was a coffee cart, at 5th and Union, serving mainly financial industry workers, whom Schomer says did not consistently frequent the same cafes or pay close attention to quality.

References

External links

The Culinary Art of Coffee, David Schomer, TEDx Seattle

1956 births
Living people
American food industry businesspeople
Businesspeople in coffee
Coffee in Seattle
United States Air Force airmen
Cornish College of the Arts alumni